The Ghost Sonata is the seventh studio album by American post-punk band Tuxedomoon, released in 1991 by LTM Recordings.

Track listing

Personnel 
Adapted from The Ghost Sonata liner notes.

Tuxedomoon
 Steven Brown
 Peter Dachert
 Blaine L. Reininger
Additional musicians
 Gregorio Bardini – flute
 Graziano Benvenutti – cello
 Sabrina Franca – violin
 Marcello Galli – clarinet
 Graziano Gerboni – clarinet
 Francesco Guidobaldi – double bass
 Antonella Lisi – cello
 Roberto Mori – oboe

Additional musicians (cont.)
 Christina Ottavi – violin
 Emanuela Piccini – violin
 Sandro Rossini – violin
 Marina Santoro – violin
 Sandra Steffanini – violin
Production and additional personnel
 Drem Bruinsma – engineering
 Bruno Donini – engineering
 Gilles Martin – engineering
 James Neiss – editing
 Jerome Sandron – engineering
 Tuxedomoon – production

Release history

References

External links 
 

1991 albums
Tuxedomoon albums
Crammed Discs albums